Algeria has competed at the IAAF World Athletics Championships on seventeen occasions, sending a delegation to every event since the 1983 edition. Its competing country code is ALG. The country has won six gold medals, two silver medals and three bronze medals at the competition. All eleven of its medals come from six athletes in distance track events. Noureddine Morceli won the men's 1500 metres titles in 1991, 1993 and 1995, while his female counterpart Hassiba Boulmerka won two golds and one bronze. Azzedine Brahmi won 1991 bronze in the men's 3000 metres steeplechase. Djabir Saïd-Guerni won the men's 800 metres bronze in 1999 before winning a gold medal in that event in 2003.

Medals by World Championships

Medalists

By athletes

By events

References 

 
Algeria
World Championships in Athletics